Sivaslı, formerly known as Sebaste is a town and district of Uşak  . Province in the inner Aegean region of Turkey.

The ancient city of Sebaste was founded by Roman Emperor Augustus (reigned 27 BC–AD 14) under the name "City of Sebaste" and was the 12th most important city of Roman Empire. In the  9th century around, the city turned into a regional bishop seat. In the period of East Roman Empire, when two churches were constructed for the bishops.

References

External links

 A web site about Sivaslı
 A photograph of the town
 A collection of photographs of the ruins of Sebaste
 

Populated places in Uşak Province
Districts of Uşak Province